Patricia (minor planet designation: 436 Patricia) is a large Main belt asteroid.

It was discovered by Max Wolf and A. Schwassmann on 13 September 1898 in Heidelberg.

References

External links 
 Lightcurve plot of 436 Patricia, Palmer Divide Observatory, B. D. Warner (2002)
 Asteroid Lightcurve Database (LCDB), query form (info )
 Dictionary of Minor Planet Names, Google books
 Asteroids and comets rotation curves, CdR – Observatoire de Genève, Raoul Behrend
 Discovery Circumstances: Numbered Minor Planets (1)-(5000) – Minor Planet Center
 
 

Background asteroids
Patricia
Patricia
18980913
Patricia